The Testament of Job (also referred to as Divrei Lyov, literally meaning "Words of Job") is a book written in the 1st century BC or the 1st century AD (thus part of a tradition often called "intertestamental literature" by Christian scholars). The earliest surviving manuscript is in Coptic, of the 5th century;  other early surviving manuscripts are in Greek and Old Slavonic.

Contents
In folktale manner in the style of Jewish aggada, it elaborates upon the Book of Job making Job a king in Egypt. Like many other Testament of ... works in the Old Testament apocrypha, it gives the narrative a framing-tale of Job's last illness, in which he calls together his sons and daughters to give them his final instructions and exhortations. The Testament of Job contains all the characters familiar in the Book of Job, with a more prominent role for Job's wife, given the name Sitidos, and many parallels to Christian beliefs that Christian readers find, such as intercession with God and forgiveness. In this text, Job’s first wife dies and the seven sons and three daughters that he had in the epilogue of the book of Job were from his second wife, whom he married after his trials ended. According to the Testament of Job, his second wife is Dinah, the daughter of Jacob. This would mean that not only was Job joined to the house of Israel, but also that Job lived between the death of Abraham and the birth of Moses.

Unlike the Biblical Book of Job, Satan's vindictiveness towards Job is described in the Testament as being due to Job destroying a non-Jewish temple. Indeed Satan is described in a far more villainous light, than simply being a prosecuting counsel. Job is equally portrayed differently; Satan is shown to directly attack Job, but fails each time due to Job's willingness to be patient, unlike the Biblical narrative where Job falls victim but retains faith.

The latter section of the work, dedicated like the Biblical text to Job's comforters, deviates even further from the Biblical narrative. Rather than complaining or challenging God, Job consistently asserts his faith despite the laments of his comforters. While one of the comforters gives up, and the others try to get him medical treatment, Job insists his faith is true, and eventually the voice of God tells the comforters to stop their behaviour. When most of the comforters choose to listen to God's voice, they decide to taunt the one remaining individual who still laments Job's fate.

Unlike many Testament of .... works, there is little concentration on ethical discourses, instead the text concentrates on delivering narrative, as well as embedding a noticeably large number of hymns. 

One passage concerns multicoloured cords for women to put around their breasts to enable them to sing in the language of the angels.  Some say this is an early example of speaking in tongues.

Montanists
The assertion has been made that the ecstatic speech of the Montanists (a later Christian sect), was another example of tongues.  This has led several scholars to suggest that the Montanists may have edited parts of the Testament of Job, adding sections such as these.

The letter ends with a reference to life after death; "It is written that he will rise up with those whom the Lord will reawaken. To our Lord by glory. Amen."

Therapeutae
It has been suggested that the work originated from the Therapeutae.  However, speaking in tongues has not been recorded as a practice of the Therapeutae.

Apocrypha categorisation
At the end of the 5th century, the Testament of Job was relegated to the apocrypha by the Gelasian Decree, concerning canonical and noncanonical books. Subsequently, the Testament of Job was ignored by Roman Catholic writers until it was published in 1833 in the series edited by Angelo Mai (Scriptorum Veterum Nova Collectio Vol. vii, pp. 180–191). Mai's manuscript had a double title:  Testament of Job the Blameless, the Conqueror in Many Contests, the Sainted (which seems to be the older title) and The Book of Job Called Jobab, and His Life, and the Transcript of His Testament.

Publishing

See also
Book of Job in Byzantine illuminated manuscripts

References

R. P. Spittler, Outside the Old Testament,
Robert A. Kraft (ed.), Testament of Job.  Missoula, Montana: Scholars Press for the Society of Biblical Literature, 1974 (Texts and Translations 5: Pseudepigrapha Series 3).
R. P. Spittler, "Testament of Job", in: J. H. Charlesworth, editor, Old Testament Pseudepigrapha, volume I Garden City, New York etc.: Doubleday, 1983.
Raymond F. Surburg, Introduction to the Intertestamental Period,
Jan Dochhorn, "Das Testament Hiobs als Produkt narrativer Exegese. Eine Studie zur Wirkungsgeschichte des griechischen und hebräischen Hiobbuchs," in Wolfgang Kraus & Martin Karrer in collaboration with Martin Meiser (ed.), Die Septuaginta - Texte, Theologien, Einflüsse. 2. Internationale Fachtagung veranstaltet von Septuaginta Deutsch (LXX.D), Wuppertal 23.-27. Juli 2008 (Tübingen: Mohr Siebeck, 2010) (Wissenschaftliche Untersuchungen zum Neuen Testament (WUNT I), 252).

External links
Online Critical Pseudepigrapha scholarly edition of the Greek manuscript evidence: Testament of Job at the OCP
Jewish Encyclopedia: Testament of Job
Early Jewish writings: Testament of Job
 
Testament of Job

Old Testament pseudepigrapha
Job (biblical figure)
Satan
Jewish apocrypha